Pedrouços Atlético Clube is a Portuguese football club from Pedrouços, Maia. It was founded on October 2, 1929 from the merging of some local neighborhood clubs, and currently plays at regional level, disputing the Divisão de Honra, the highest level championship organized by A.F. Porto (Porto's football association), that grants access to the national championships.

External links
 zerozero.pt

Association football clubs established in 1929
Football clubs in Portugal
1929 establishments in Portugal